Hidetoshi Nishijima may refer to:
Hidetoshi Nishijima (politician)
Hidetoshi Nishijima (actor)